Hector Wegmann (died 1589) was a Roman Catholic prelate who served as Auxiliary Bishop of Passau (1575–1589).

Biography
On 4 Jul 1575, Hector Wegmann was appointed during the papacy of Pope Gregory XIII as Auxiliary Bishop of Passau and Titular Bishop of Symbalia. He served as Auxiliary Bishop of Passau until his death on 31 Jan 1589.

See also 
Catholic Church in Germany

References 

16th-century Roman Catholic bishops in Bavaria
Bishops appointed by Pope Gregory XIII
1589 deaths